Delusions is the second album from the British progressive metal band To-Mera. Its musical style is similar to that of their debut album Transcendental.

The album was initially released in a limited edition glossy slipcase featuring the band logo embroidered onto it. This was available directly through the band website and was limited to 2000 copies, all of which are now sold out.

The artwork was once again done by Eliran Kantor.

Track listing
All lyrics by Julie Kiss, music as noted

"The Lie" (Lee Barrett, Tom MacLean) - 7:29 
"Mirage" (MacLean) - 7:11 
"The Glory of a New Day" (MacLean) - 8:24 
"Inside the Hourglass" (MacLean) - 8:19 
"A Sorrow to Kill" (MacLean) - 8:03 
"Asylum" (MacLean) - 5:40
"Fallen From Grace" (MacLean, Hugo Sheppard) - 8:18 
"Temptation" (Sheppard) - 8:40

Personnel
Band members
Julie Kiss - vocals
Thomas MacLean - guitars
Hugo Sheppard - keyboards
Lee Barrett - bass
Paul Westwood - drums

Additional musicians
Laurence Hill - percussion 
Hugh Greenish - saxophone and bass clarinet

Production
Brett Caldas-Lima - producer, engineer, mixing, orchestration

References

External links
Recording blog
Tower Studios myspace

2008 albums
To-Mera albums
Albums with cover art by Eliran Kantor